Lars Lyssand is a retired American soccer player who played professionally in the USL First Division.

Born to a Norwegian immigrant father and a Swedish immigrant mother, Lyssand grew up in Northern California.  He graduated from Woodside High School where he was a three-sport athlete – soccer, football and baseball.  Lyssand attended San Jose State University, playing on the men’s soccer team from 1998 to 2001, and was the 2001 Mountain Pacific Sports Federation Player of the Year.  In February 2002, the San Jose Earthquakes selected Lyssand with the last pick (70th overall) of the 2002 MLS SuperDraft.  Although he appeared as a guest player in an August 2002 game against America, Lyssand never played for the Earthquakes during the MLS season.  In 2003, he signed with the Syracuse Salty Dogs of the USL A-League.  The Salty Dogs ceased operations following the 2004 season.  In March 2005, Lyssand signed a two-year contract with the Montreal Impact where he was a two-year starter.  In 2007, Lyssand did not report to the Impact, refusing to play for them.  On June 14, 2007,  the Impact traded Lyssand to the Puerto Rico Islanders in exchange for Alen Marcina.  Lyssand finished the season with the Islanders then retired from professional soccer.

References

Living people
1979 births
American soccer players
American expatriate soccer players
Montreal Impact (1992–2011) players
Puerto Rico Islanders players
San Jose State Spartans men's soccer players
Syracuse Salty Dogs players
A-League (1995–2004) players
USL First Division players
San Jose Earthquakes draft picks
Soccer players from California
Expatriate footballers in Puerto Rico
American people of Norwegian descent
American people of Swedish descent
Association football defenders 
Association football midfielders